Ahora Es may refer to:
"Ahora Es", slogan of Danilo Medina, President of the Dominican Republic
"Ahora Es" (song), 2008
"Ahora Es", a 1995 song by 2 in a Room

See also
Ahora (disambiguation)